Chahar Asiab (also Romanized as Chahār Āsīāb) is a village in Howmeh Rural District, in the Central District of Behbahan County, Khuzestan Province, Iran. At the 2006 census, its population was 128, in 31 families.

References 

Populated places in Behbahan County